Burger Stevens is a hamburger restaurant with multiple locations in the Portland, Oregon metropolitan area.

History 

Burger Stevens was established in 2016. The business has operated from a food cart in Hillsdale.

Burger Stevens was operating at Pioneer Courthouse Square until the COVID-19 pandemic. In 2022, owner Don Salamone relocated the cart to Prost Marketplace in the north Portland part of the Boise neighborhood. The business also operates from Hinterland Bar and Food Carts in southeast Portland's Mount Tabor neighborhood, as of 2022.

Burger Stevens operated from BG's Food Cartel in Beaverton, as of 2021.

Reception 
In 2019, Willamette Week's Michael Mannheimer recommended Burger Stevens for "the quintessential all-American meal". In 2020, Brooke Jackson-Glidden of Eater Portland said the business offers "what could be Portland's best burger".

See also 

 List of hamburger restaurants

References

External links 

 
 

2016 establishments in Oregon
Boise, Portland, Oregon
Food carts in Portland, Oregon
Hamburger restaurants in the United States
Mount Tabor, Portland, Oregon
North Portland, Oregon
Restaurants established in 2016
Restaurants in Beaverton, Oregon
Restaurants in Portland, Oregon